James Herbert Garfield (19 April 1874–1949) was an English footballer who played in the Football League for Aston Villa. His only appearance for Villa came on 13 November 1899 where he scored in a 2–0 victory against Stoke.

References

1874 births
1949 deaths
English footballers
Association football forwards
English Football League players
Gravesend United F.C. players
Aston Villa F.C. players
Derby County F.C. players
Kettering Town F.C. players
Northampton Town F.C. players